The 2016–17 season was Hajer's return to the Saudi First Division, having been relegated from the Pro League last season. This season they are participating in the First Division, King Cup and Crown Prince Cup. The season covered the period from 1 July 2016 to 30 June 2017.

First-team squad

Out on loan

Transfers

In

Out

Loans in

Loans out

Competitions

Pre-season friendlies

First Division

League table

Results by matchday

Results summary

Matches

King Cup

Crown Prince Cup

Statistics

Appearances and goals

|-
! colspan=14 style=background:#dcdcdc; text-align:center|Goalkeepers

|-
! colspan=14 style=background:#dcdcdc; text-align:center|Defenders

|-
! colspan=14 style=background:#dcdcdc; text-align:center|Midfielders

|-
! colspan=14 style=background:#dcdcdc; text-align:center|Forwards

|-
! colspan=14 style=background:#dcdcdc; text-align:center| Players sent out on loan this season

|-
! colspan=14 style=background:#dcdcdc; text-align:center| Player who made an appearance this season but have left the club

|-
|}

Goalscorers
Last updated on 5 May 2017.

References

Hajer Club seasons
Hajer